Raymond Eric Stanley Whiteside (born 13 April 1932) is an Indian-born Australian field hockey player. Whiteside competed in the men's tournament at the 1956 Summer Olympics and is the son of the 1936 Olympian British Indian sprinter Eric Whiteside.

References

External links
 

1932 births
Living people
Australian male field hockey players
Olympic field hockey players of Australia
Field hockey players at the 1956 Summer Olympics
Field hockey players from Lahore
Anglo-Indian people
Indian emigrants to Australia
Australian people of Anglo-Indian descent
Australian sportspeople of Indian descent